The following television stations operate on virtual channel 3 in the United States:

 K02EG-D in Ursine, Nevada
 K02OD-D in Shelter Cove, California
 K03CM-D in Pioche, Nevada
 K03GA-D in Elim, Alaska
 K03GL-D in King Mountain, etc., Alaska
 K03II-D in Manhattan, Kansas
 K03IM-D in Eugene, Oregon
 K03JD-D in Wendover, Utah
 K03JE-D in Victoria, Texas
 K04RS-D in Salinas, California
 K05GJ-D in Thayne, etc., Wyoming
 K07GJ-D in Hoopa, California
 K07QC-D in Driggs, Idaho
 K09ZB-D in Havre, Montana
 K09AAD-D in Sitka, Alaska
 K10AW-D in Challis, Idaho
 K10FC-D in Dodson, Montana
 K11BD-D in Leadore, Idaho
 K11CN-D in Caliente, Nevada
 K11CP-D in Fish Creek, Idaho
 K11GX-D in Whitewater, Montana
 K11LC-D in Prescott, Arizona
 K11WK-D in Stanford, Montana
 K11WQ-D in West Knees, Montana
 K12FB-D in Saco, Montana
 K12OF-D in Bullhead City, Arizona
 K12RE-D in Denton, Montana
 K13GP-D in Malta, Montana
 K13OU-D in Chinook, Montana
 K14NA-D in Globe & Miami, Arizona
 K14ND-D in Overton, Nevada
 K15HY-D in Williams-Ashfork, Arizona
 K15LD-D in Lewistown, Montana
 K16EV-D in Bullhead City, Arizona
 K16LX-D in Juliaetta, Idaho
 K17CL-D in Pahrump, Nevada
 K18JX-D in Hoehne, Colorado
 K18KM-D in Conrad, Montana
 K18LM-D in Mud Canyon, New Mexico
 K19JQ-D in Big Sandy, Montana
 K19JR-D in Wolf Point, Montana
 K20KO-D in Julesburg, Colorado
 K20MC-D in Pahrump, Nevada
 K21IM-D in Fort Sumner, New Mexico
 K21OA-D in Holbrook, Idaho
 K23FV-D in Kingman, Arizona
 K23MV-D in Carlsbad, New Mexico
 K24DT-D in Aberdeen, South Dakota
 K24MB-D in Hobbs, New Mexico
 K25DH-D in Meadview, Arizona
 K25KY-D in Fresno, California
 K25MG-D in Flagstaff, Arizona
 K25NJ-D in Sweetgrass, etc., Montana
 K26MT-D in Paso Robles, California
 K26MV-D in Soldier Canyon, New Mexico
 K27CS-D in Montpelier, Idaho
 K27HM-D in Quanah, Texas
 K27JW-D in Joplin, Montana
 K28OA-D in Cottonwood, Arizona
 K29FD-D in Lake Havasu City, Arizona
 K29FM-D in Artesia, New Mexico
 K29LJ-D in Altus, Oklahoma
 K30HD-D in Tucumcari, New Mexico
 K30QE-D in Panaca, Nevada
 K31GS-D in Roswell, New Mexico
 K31KE-D in San Luis Obispo, etc., California
 K32ME-D in Camp Verde, etc., Arizona
 K32NV-D in Malad City, Iowa
 K33GF-D in Preston, Idaho
 K33MJ-D in Pahrump, Nevada
 K34NF-D in Soda Springs, Idaho
 K35GU-D in Ruidoso, New Mexico
 K41HQ-D in Quanah, Texas
 K46BX-D in Phillips County, Montana
 KATC in Lafayette, Louisiana
 KBME-TV in Bismarck, North Dakota
 KBTX-TV in Bryan, Texas
 KCDO-TV in Sterling, Colorado
 KCNL-LD in Reno, Nevada
 KCRA-TV in Sacramento, California
 KDLH in Duluth, Minnesota
 KDLO-TV in Florence, South Dakota
 KENW in Portales, New Mexico
 KEYT-TV in Santa Barbara, California
 KFDX-TV in Wichita Falls, Texas
 KFTU-DT in Douglas, Arizona
 KGMV in Wailuku, Hawaii
 KHME in Rapid City, South Dakota
 KIDK in Idaho Falls, Idaho
 KIEM-TV in Eureka, California
 KIII in Corpus Christi, Texas
 KIMT in Mason City, Iowa
 KLEW-TV in Lewiston, Idaho
 KLHP-LD in Dallas, Texas
 KLNE-TV in Lexington, Nebraska
 KMTV-TV in Omaha, Nebraska
 KOAB-TV in Bend, Oregon
 KOET in Eufaula, Oklahoma
 KPWT-LD in Astoria, Oregon
 KREG-TV in Glenwood Springs, Colorado
 KRTV in Great Falls, Montana
 KSAN-TV in San Angelo, Texas
 KSGA-LD in Los Angeles, California
 KSNV in Las Vegas, Nevada
 KSNW in Wichita, Kansas
 KSWK in Lakin, Kansas
 KTBS-TV in Shreveport, Louisiana
 KTOO-TV in Juneau, Alaska
 KTVJ-LD in Nampa, Idaho
 KTVK in Phoenix, Arizona
 KTVO in Kirksville, Missouri
 KYTV in Springfield, Missouri
 KYUS-TV in Miles City, Montana
 KYW-TV in Philadelphia, Pennsylvania
 W03BW-D in Midland City, Alabama
 W03BX-D in Sutton, West Virginia
 W18EG-D in Onancock, Virginia
 W23EU-D in Rutland, Vermont
 W27EF-D in Charleston, West Virginia
 W33EJ-D in Moorefield, West Virginia
 WAVE in Louisville, Kentucky
 WBTV in Charlotte, North Carolina
 WCAX-TV in Burlington, Vermont
 WCBI-LD in Starkville, Mississippi
 WCIA in Champaign, Illinois
 WDVZ-CD in Greensboro, Alabama
 WEAR-TV in Pensacola, Florida
 WEDQ in Tampa, Florida
 WEDU in Tampa, Florida
 WFSB in Hartford, Connecticut
 WHNE-LD in Detroit, Michigan
 WHSV-TV in Harrisonburg, Virginia
 WIPM-TV in Mayaguez, Puerto Rico
 WISC-TV in Madison, Wisconsin
 WJMN-TV in Escanaba, Michigan
 WKYC in Cleveland, Ohio
 WLBT in Jackson, Mississippi
 WPSU-TV in Clearfield, Pennsylvania
 WRBL in Columbus, Georgia
 WRCB in Chattanooga, Tennessee
 WREG-TV in Memphis, Tennessee
 WSAV-TV in Savannah, Georgia
 WSAZ-TV in Huntington, West Virginia
 WSHM-LD in Springfield, Massachusetts
 WSIL-TV in Harrisburg, Illinois
 WSTM-TV in Syracuse, New York
 WTKR in Norfolk, Virginia
 WWAY in Wilmington, North Carolina
 WWMT in Kalamazoo, Michigan
 WWWB-LD in Clarkrange, Tennessee
 WZNA-LD in Guaynabo, Puerto Rico

The following stations, which are no longer licensed, formerly operated on virtual channel 3:
 K02QM-D in Lemon, etc., Alaska
 K03DI-D in Chelan Butte, Washington
 K03FM-D in Haines, Alaska
 K03GP-D in Sheldon Point, Alaska
 K03HY-D in San Francisco, California
 K03IR-D in Bakersfield, California
 K03IU-D in San Bernardino, California
 K07GD-D in Glenwood Springs, Colorado
 K07ZB-D in Mendenhall Valley, Alaska
 K17CG-D in Ukiah, California
 K48OQ-D in Lowry, South Dakota
 KVTU-LD in Agoura Hills, California
 WBCF-LD in Florence, Alabama

References

03 virtual